...In einer Zukunft aus Tränen und Stahl ("In a future of tears and steel") is the second studio album from Austrian darkwave band L'Âme Immortelle.

Track listing

Personnel 
 Thomas Rainer – vocals, keyboards, lyrics, composition and production
 Sonja Kraushofer – vocals
 Hannes Medwenitsch – keyboards, composition and production

References

L'Âme Immortelle albums
1999 albums
GUN Records albums
German-language albums